Jackie Oates is an English folk singer and fiddle player.

Life
Oates was born in Congleton in Cheshire in 1983 but grew up in Staffordshire. At the age of 18, she moved to Devon to study English literature at Exeter University and was based in Devon until 2011, when she moved to Oxford where she lives with her young family. She was a member of Rachel Unthank and the Winterset between 2003 and 2007.

She was a finalist in the BBC Radio 2 Young Folk Award in 2003, and was one of the nominees for the BBC Radio 2 Folk Awards "Horizon Award" in 2008, going on to win that award in 2009, as well as the award for best traditional track for her recording of "The Lark in the Morning".

She has performed as part of the folk trio Wistman's Wood and sung with Morris Offspring and The Imagined Village. More recently, she has performed with John Spiers of Bellowhead, with whom she recorded the album, Needle Pin, Needle Pin in 2020. 

Her brother is the singer, multi-instrumentalist and record producer Jim Moray, and they have guested on each other's albums.

Discography
Solo albums
Jackie Oates (Hands On Music HMCD25, 2006)
The Violet Hour (Chudleigh Roots CR002, 2008)
Hyperboreans (One Little Indian TPLP1034CD, 2009)
Saturnine (ECC Records ECC004, 2011)
Lullabies (ECC Records ECC009, 2013)
The Spyglass & The Herringbone (ECC Records ECC015, 2015)
The Joy of Living (ECC Records ECC018, 2018)

With other acts
 Cruel Sister – Rachel Unthank and the Winterset (Rabble Rouser RR005, 2005)
Bending The Dark – The Imagined Village (ECC Records ECC006, 2012)
Wings (EP) – with Megan Henwood (2016)
Needle Pin, Needle Pin – with John Spiers (2020)

References

External links
Official website
Facebook page
Twitter profile
The Spiral Earth Interview: Jackie Oates
The Folk Radio UK Interview: Jackie Oates

Living people
1983 births
21st-century British singers
21st-century violinists
Alumni of the University of Exeter
English fiddlers
English folk musicians
English folk singers
People from Congleton
People from Staffordshire